Peter Depp (born July 26, 1981) is an American stand-up comedian, gay rights activist, anti-bullying activist, writer, and actor best known for his role in Sundance Channel’s GLAAD Nominated and acclaimed hit show Girls Who Like Boys Who Like Boys. He’s also known for his Huffington Post article, “Being A Gay Dad.”

Early life
Depp was born July 26, 1981 in Glen Cove, New York, to Sheryl and Gary Depp, a New York Police officer. He has one sister named Stephanie. As a child he struggled with his sexuality.

Career

March 1, 2012 Peter and his best friend were featured in Nashville Scene as 2012's Power Couple for the 2012 People Issue.

References

External links
 
 http://www.sundancechannel.com/blog/2011/10/girls-who-like-boys-who-like-boys-season-2

1981 births
Living people
American gay actors
Male actors from New York (state)
American stand-up comedians
Comedians from New York (state)
21st-century American comedians